The Sharaf Cabinet was the cabinet of Egypt which was led by prime minister Essam Sharaf from 3 March 2011 to 21 November 2011. It was an interim cabinet and reshuffled in July 2011.

List of members

References

Cabinets of Egypt
2011 establishments in Egypt
2011 disestablishments in Egypt
Cabinets established in 2011
Cabinets disestablished in 2011